Mount Tricorn is a distinctive massif whose vertical rock faces rise to 1,120 m and surround a snow-covered interior which is lower except for a 1,610 m peak in the northwest portion, standing at the head of Wright Inlet on the east coast of Palmer Land. Discovered by members of the United States Antarctic Service (USAS) in a flight from East Base on December 30, 1940, and named for its resemblance to a gigantic tri-cornered hat.

See also
Mount Gorham, mountain just southwest of Mount Tricorn

References

External links

Mountains of Palmer Land